Maruti Bhapkar is an Indian politician, who belongs to Shiv Sena party. He is former a founder member and convenor of Pune District for Aam Aadmi Party. He is a social and IAC activist in Pimpri Chinchwad and Pune. He was a corporator at Pimpri Chinchwad municipal corporation from year 2007 to 2012. He fought the 2009 Lok Sabha elections from Maval as an independent candidate.

Jan Lokpal Andolan 
Maruti Bhapkar was associated with Anna Hazare and Arvind Kejriwal in the Jan Lokpal Andolan since the first day. He plays a significant role in the andolan related activities in Pune and Pimpri Chinchwad area. He participated in the Jail Bharo andolan following Anna-ji's call. He introduced a proposal supporting the Jan Lokpal Andolan in PCMC's general body meeting and it was passed with majority.

Experimentation and implementation of Swaraj model 
In his capacity as the Pimpri Chinchwad Municipal Corporation corporator from 2007 to 2012, Maruti Bhapkar successfully implemented the Swaraj model in his ward. Every 3 months, a Jan Sabha was held in the ward to engage public consultations on various issues such as roads, parks, cultural center, slum rehabilitation, electricity and police. He implemented public proposals that went against his personal opinion.

Anti-corruption work 
 Since its establishment in 1982, Pimpri Chinchwad Municipal Corporation was not audited until Maruti's intervention in 2000. He filed a PIL in the Bombay High Court following which an audit was conducted. The audit exposed Rs. 4 billion worth of irregularities.
 Bhapkar's agitation demanding action against irregularities in MIDC land allocation to NCP's Ajit Pawar aide resulted in Rs. 7.2 million fine against NCP MLA Vilas Lande.
 Using RTI, Maruti Bhapkar exposed the Pawar family involvement in Lavasa scam.

2009 Lok Sabha Election 
Maruti Bhapkar fought the 2009 Lok Sabha Election. His main election plank was farmers' displacement because of Special Economic Zones (SEZs) in Raigad and Pune districts. Though he received wide support from civil society leaders including Justice Sachar, Medha Patkar, Aruna Roy and Arvind Kejriwal., he lost the elections to Shiv Sena's Gajanan Babar.

References

Living people
1970 births
Indian whistleblowers
Indian civil rights activists
Activists from Maharashtra
Aam Aadmi Party politicians
21st-century Indian politicians
People from Pimpri-Chinchwad
Marathi politicians
Maharashtra politicians
Shiv Sena politicians